Rear Admiral Charles Arthur Winfield Weston CB (12 July 1922 – January 1998) was a Royal Navy officer who became President of the Royal Naval College, Greenwich.

Naval career
Educated at the Merchant Taylors' School, Weston joined the Royal Navy in 1940 and served in World War II. He became Secretary to the Second Sea Lord in 1965, Chief of Staff to the Commander-in-Chief Naval Home Command in 1969 and Director of Naval Physical Training and Sport in 1972. He went on to be Director of the Defence Administration Planning Staff in 1973, Director of Royal Naval Quartering in 1975 and President of the Royal Naval College, Greenwich in 1976 before retiring in 1978. He was appointed CB in June 1978.

In retirement he became Appeals Secretary for the King Edward VII's Hospital for Officers.

References

1922 births
1998 deaths
Royal Navy rear admirals
Companions of the Order of the Bath
Admiral presidents of the Royal Naval College, Greenwich
Royal Navy officers of World War II
Royal Navy logistics officers